Eyes of a Stranger is an album released by the R&B band the Deele in 1987.

The third album released by the Deele, it became the band's most commercially successful album, on the strength of what is perhaps the group's best-known hit, the R&B top 5 and pop top ten single, "Two Occasions," along with the R&B top ten follow-up, "Shoot 'Em Up Movies." It was shortly after the release of this album that primary group songwriters Kenny "Babyface" Edmonds and L.A. Reid left the band to pursue production work.

The album was certified Gold by the RIAA.

Track listing
 Two Occasions  (Kenny "Babyface" Edmonds, Darnell "Dee" Bristol, Sid Johnson) - 5:51 
 Shoot 'Em up Movies  (Kenny Nolan) - 4:20
 Let No One Separate Us  (Darnell "Dee" Bristol, Antonio "L.A." Reid, Kenny "Babyface" Edmonds) - 4:15
 Eyes of a Stranger  (Daryl Simmons, Carlos "Satin" Greene) - 4:52
 Can-U-Dance  (Carlos "Satin" Greene, Antonio "L.A." Reid, Dwain Mitchell) - 4:34
 She Wanted  (Darnell "Dee" Bristol, Kevin "Kayo" Roberson, Antonio "L.A." Reid) - 4:40
 Hip Chic  (Carlos "Satin" Greene, Les Collier, Darnell "Dee" Bristol, Antonio "L.A." Reid, Kevin "Kayo" Roberson) - 4:15
 So Many Thangz  (Darnell "Dee" Bristol, Kenny "Babyface" Edmonds, D. Simmons) - 5:18
 Eyes of a Stranger (Reprise)  (Carlos "Satin" Greene, Simmons) - 1:18

Chart performance

Singles

References

External links
 The Deele-Eyes of a Stranger at Discogs

1987 albums
SOLAR Records albums
Albums produced by L.A. Reid
Albums produced by Babyface (musician)